Elisabeth Wagner (born September 6, 1957), known professionally as Liz Rose, is an American country music songwriter, best known for her work with Taylor Swift. She has co-written seventeen of Swift's officially released songs, including "You Belong with Me", which was nominated for the Grammy Award for Song of the Year, "Teardrops on My Guitar", "White Horse", which won both Swift and her a Grammy Award for Best Country Song in 2010 and "All Too Well (Taylor's Version)", which reached number one on the Billboard Hot 100 in 2021 and was nominated for the Grammy Award for Song of the Year in 2023. She works regularly alongside songwriters Lori McKenna and Hillary Lindsey, collectively calling themselves The Love Junkies and notably writing songs for Little Big Town and Carrie Underwood, among others.

Biography 
Rose was born in Dallas, Texas, and raised in Irving, Texas. Rose moved to Nashville, Tennessee, with her then-husband, Johnny Rose, and began writing songs through the suggestion of a friend. One of her first cuts was "Elisabeth," which was recorded by Billy Gilman. In 2003, Gary Allan took Rose's "Songs About Rain" (co-written with Pat McLaughlin) into the country's top 20. Rose spoke in the podcast Broken Record about being married 4 times.

Rose began writing songs with Taylor Swift on Swift's 2006 self-titled debut album, on which Rose has seven co-writer's credits. Among those cuts were the album's first two singles, "Tim McGraw" and "Teardrops on My Guitar", which helped Rose win a Songwriter of the Year award from SESAC in 2007. Rose continued to collaborate with Swift on her second album, 2008's Fearless. Swift and Rose co-wrote the singles, "White Horse" and "You Belong with Me" as well as the title track. "White Horse" won both of them the Grammy Award for Best Country Song in 2010, and "You Belong with Me" was nominated for Grammy Award for Song of the Year. On Swift's fourth album, 2012's Red, Rose co-wrote one song, entitled "All Too Well".

She has also worked with songwriting for Swedish country singer Jill Johnson and Nashville-based band Mockingbird Sun, co-writing their second single "Lucky Guy". 

With regular collaborators, Lori McKenna and Hillary Lindsay as part of The Love Junkies, she co-wrote the song "Girl Crush" performed by Little Big Town. For the song, she won the 2015 CMA Song of the Year and was nominated at the 2016 Grammy Awards for Song of The Year and Best Country Song, winning the latter.

She also contributed to Carrie Underwood's album Storyteller with the song "Like I'll Never Love You Again".

Her daughter is country/Americana artist Caitlin Rose.

Liz Rose first began her career as a songwriter at the age of 37.
A successful songwriter, she does not play an instrument.

Rose is one of the board of directors of National Music Publishers' Association.
</ref>

Songs written

Awards and nominations

Notes

References 

American women country singers
American country singer-songwriters
Grammy Award winners
Living people
People from Dallas
1957 births
Singer-songwriters from Texas
21st-century American women